John Michael Schroder Sr. (born February 23, 1961) is an American businessman from Covington, Louisiana who currently serves as state treasurer. He was formerly a Republican member of the Louisiana House of Representatives for District 77 in St. Tammany Parish in suburban New Orleans.

Career 

Schroder vacated his House seat on June 8, 2017, to devote full-time to his campaign for Louisiana state treasurer in the special election set for October 14, 2017, to fill the position vacated on January 3 by U.S. Senator John Kennedy. In his statement of candidacy, Schroder said that he has recognized since his election to the State House that "we had fundamental issues with our budget and spending practices. I have always taken a stand for the Louisiana taxpayer and that will not change when elected treasurer." State Senator Neil Riser of Columbia in Caldwell Parish in North Louisiana was also a candidate for the seat. John Schroder and Democrat Derrick Edwards advanced to the runoff, where Schroder won. In October 2022 Schroder said Louisiana pulled $794 million out of the BlackRock Inc. investment firm due to the company putting political and social goals ahead of robust returns for state taxpayers. Jessi Parfair, campaign representative at the Sierra Club's "Beyond Dirty Fuels" campaign called Schroder's announcement "just another flavor of climate denial cooked up by right-wing politicians and their fossil fuel donors."

References

External links
 Treasurer homepage

|-

1961 births
21st-century American politicians
American real estate businesspeople
Catholics from Louisiana
East Jefferson High School alumni
Living people
Republican Party members of the Louisiana House of Representatives
People from Covington, Louisiana
Politicians from New Orleans
Southeastern Louisiana University alumni
United States Army officers
State treasurers of Louisiana